The 1997 Alberta general election was held on March 11, 1997, to elect members of the Legislative Assembly of Alberta.

Ralph Klein's Conservatives were re-elected, with increased number of seats in the Legislature. Liberal Official Opposition lost some seats dropping from 32 to 18, but retaining the status of Official Opposition. NDP gained two, to have a grand total of two seats.

Background 
The Progressive Conservative Association had governed Alberta since 1971, and premier Ralph Klein led the party into his second general election as party leader. The previous election in 1993 was the best result for the Liberal Party since its last electoral victory in 1917.

This was the second consecutive election fought on a new set of electoral boundaries, due to an Alberta Court of Appeal decision that was critical of the map created in 1992. The government amended the Electoral Boundaries Commission Act, introducing the present system where the commission is made up of a justice from the Court, two members appointed by the governing party, and two members appointed by the official opposition. A new Commission was created, which issued its recommendations for a new set of electoral boundaries in 1996.

Results 
Ralph Klein's second election as leader of the PCs was considerably more successful than his first. The party won over half the popular vote, and 63 of the 83 seats in the legislature for its eighth consecutive term in government. The party continued to dominate in Calgary and rural areas, and managed to regain a foothold in Edmonton where it won two seats.

The Liberal Party of Grant Mitchell lost about 7% of the popular vote it had won in the 1993 election. The party's legislative caucus was reduced from 32 members to 18.

Pam Barrett led the New Democratic Party back into the legislature with two seats (both in Edmonton), despite winning an even smaller share of the popular vote than in 1993.

The Social Credit Party also re-emerged, placing a strong second in several rural ridings, but did not win any seats.

Overall voter turnout was 53.75%.

Notes:

* Party did not nominate candidates in the previous election.

x – less than 0.005% of the popular vote

Results by riding

|-
|Airdrie-Rocky View|||
|Carol Louise Haley8,49268.93%
|
|James Welsh2,19717.83%
|
|Doris Bannister4823.91%
|
|Peter Smits1,1259.13%
|
||||
|
|-
|Athabasca-Wabasca|||
|Mike Cardinal3,38058.65%
|
|Tony Mercredi1,48125.70%
|
|Dean Patriquin3005.21%
|
|Curtis Gunderson4688.12%
|
|Harlan Light (Green)1001.74%|||
|Mike Cardinal
|-
|Banff-Cochrane|||
|Janis Tarchuk7,18060.96%
|
|Judy Stewart3,15126.75%
|
|Jeff Eamon7546.40%
|
|Scott Mudford6615.61%
|
||||
|Brian Evans
|-
|Barrhead-Westlock|||
|Kenneth R. Kowalski6,19560.49%
|
|Dale Greig2,13020.80%
|
|Joe Woytowich6436.28%
|
|J. Harvey Yuill1,24412.15%
|
||||
|Kenneth R. Kowalski
|-
|Bonnyville-Cold Lake|||
|Denis Ducharme4,59358.32%
|
|Leo Vasseur2,32329.50%
|
|
|
|Robert Kratchmer94812.04%
|
||||
|
|-
|Calgary-Bow|||
|Bonnie Laing6,66454.07%
|
|Mark Dickerson4,09133.19%
|
|Brent Johner1,1449.28%
|
|
|
|Ronnie Shapka (Nat. Law)1581.28%David Crowe (Green)1871.52%|||
|Bonnie Laing
|-
|Calgary-Buffalo
|
|Terri-Lynn Bradford4,11543.52%|||
|Gary Dickson4,31045.58%
|
|Neil McKinnon5475.79%
|
|Raymond Neilson3003.17%
|
|Ralph Holt (Nat. Law)1151.22%|||
|Gary Dickson
|-
|Calgary-Cross|||
|Yvonne Fritz5,96466.88%
|
|Keith Jones2,45627.54%
|
|
|
|Maurizio Terrigno4675.24%
|
||||
|Yvonne Fritz
|-
|Calgary-Currie|||
|Jocelyn Burgener5,95253.83%
|
|Mairi Matheson3,63632.88%
|
|Liz Blackwood7126.44%
|
|Jeff Townsend6105.52%
|
|Richard Shelford (Nat. Law)1090.99%|||
|Jocelyn Burgener
|-
|Calgary-East|||
|Moe Amery4,85759.78%
|
|Kelly McDonnell1,99024.49%
|
|Marg Elliot6097.50%
|
|Raymond (Chick) Hurst6137.54%
|
||||
|Moe Amery
|-
|Calgary-Egmont|||
|Denis Herard8,84264.48%
|
|Pam York3,33624.33%
|
|Larry Kowalchuk6544.77%
|
|Douglas Cooper8366.10%
|
||||
|Denis Herard
|-
|Calgary-Elbow|||
|Ralph Klein8,23757.78%
|
|Harold Swanson5,19536.44%
|
|Shawn Christie3072.15%
|
|Lera G. Shirley4212.95%
|
|Frank Haika (Nat. Law)750.53%|||
|Ralph Klein
|-
|Calgary-Fish Creek|||
|Heather Forsyth8,27466.47%
|
|Marie Cameron3,02024.26%
|
|Muriel Turner-Wilkinson3482.80%
|
|Jeff Willerton7786.25%
|
||||
|Heather Forsyth
|-
|Calgary-Foothills|||
|Patricia Black8,84960.35%
|
|Albert W. Ludwig4,33929.59%
|
|Brenda Wadey7204.91%
|
|Kevin Davidson7355.01%
|
||||
|Patricia Black
|-
|Calgary-Fort|||
|Wayne Cao4,41048.53%
|
|Shirley-Anne Reuben2,81731.00%
|
|Ken Sahil8919.81%
|
|Bren Blanchet91610.08%
|
||||
|
|-
|Calgary-Glenmore|||
|Ron Stevens8,24758.02%
|
|Wayne Stewart4,91934.61%
|
|Grace Johner4353.06%
|
|Vernon Cook5834.10%
|
||||
|Dianne Mirosh
|-
|Calgary-Lougheed|||
|Marlene Graham7,76165.89%
|
|Darryl G. Hawkins2,90624.67%
|
|Mara Vogel5334.53%
|
|Hub Blanchet5604.75%
|
||||
|Jim Dinning
|-
|Calgary-McCall|||
|Shiraz Shariff5,11858.67%
|
|Amar Singh2,70130.96%
|
|
|
|Rory M. Cory87610.04%
|
||||
|Harry Sohal
|-
|Calgary-Montrose|||
|Hung Pham4,55658.56%
|
|Diane Danielson2,57633.11%
|
|
|
|Christopher Dick5366.89%
|
|Neeraj Varma (Nat. Law)941.21%|||
|Hung Pham
|-
|Calgary-Mountain View|||
|Mark Hlady5,46848.36%
|
|Patricia Ennis3,26928.91%
|
|Gordon M. Christie2,08518.44%
|
|Jason Nicholas4503.98%
|
||||
|Mark Hlady
|-
|Calgary-North Hill|||
|Richard Charles Magnus6,37958.36%
|
|John Schmale3,29730.16%
|
|Jason Ness1,18310.82%
|
|
|
||||
|Richard Charles Magnus
|-
|Calgary-North West|||
|Greg Melchin9,19053.19%
|
|Frank Bruseker7,22641.82%
|
|Jeff Pattinson3421.98%
|
|Douglas A. Picken5032.91%
|
||||
|Frank Bruseker
|-
|Calgary-Nose Creek|||
|Gary Mar7,81564.33%
|
|Peter Willott2,89423.82%
|
|Doral Johnson6965.73%
|
|Greg Greene7155.89%
|
||||
|Gary Mar
|-
|Calgary-Shaw|||
|Jonathan Niles Havelock12,30475.21%
|
|Sharon L. Howe2,86017.48%
|
|Shawn Keown4852.96%
|
|Michael Roth6243.81%
|
|Almas Walden (Nat. Law)690.42%|||
|Jonathan Niles Havelock
|-
|Calgary-Varsity|||
|Murray D. Smith7,23251.34%
|
|Carrol Jaques5,41438.43%
|
|Dirk Huysman6404.54%
|
|Mike Bressers6464.59%
|
|Joel Ashworth (Green)1320.94%|||
|Murray D. Smith
|-
|Calgary-West|||
|Karen Kryczka8,47856.18%
|
|Paul Adams4,99533.10%
|
|Rudy Rogers5343.54%
|
|Craig Chandler1,0707.09%
|
||||
|Danny Dalla-Longa
|-
|Cardston-Taber-Warner|||
|Ron Hierath5,15759.06%
|
|James Jackson1,47116.85%
|
|Suzanne Sirias5185.93%
|
|Ken Rose1,56817.96%
|
||||
|
|-
|Clover Bar-Fort Saskatchewan|||
|Rob Lougheed6,86447.61%
|
|Muriel Abdurahman6,36444.14%
|
|Michael Berezowsky9226.39%
|
|
|
|Max Cornelssen (Ind.)2351.63%
||
|Muriel Abdurahman
|-
|Cypress-Medicine Hat|||
|Lorne Taylor5,75463.18%
|
|Beverley Britton Clarke2,21724.34%
|
|Don Crisall3834.21%
|
|Maurice Perron7287.99%
|
||||
|Lorne Taylor
|-
|Drayton Valley-Calmar|||
|Tom Thurber6,49260.41%
|
|Moe Hamdon2,91227.10%
|
|Tom Fuller8237.66%
|
|
|
|Roy Andresen (Ind.)4884.55%
||
|Tom Thurber
|-
|Drumheller-Chinook|||
|Shirley McClellan6,06363.28%
|
|Einar B. Davison1,43214.95%
|
|
|
|Dale Trefz2,05621.46%
|
||||
|
|-
|Dunvegan|||
|Glen Clegg5,14954.56%
|
|Fred Trotter3,31435.11%
|
|Margaret McCuaig-Boyd96110.18%
|
|
|
||||
|Glen Clegg
|-
|Edmonton-Beverly-Clareview|||
|Julius E. Yankowsky3,48434.93%
|
|Johanne Tardif3,12731.35%
|
|Bill Stephenson2,84228.49%
|
|Doug Smith3763.77%
|
|Andy Chichak (Ind.)1001.00%William Finn	(Forum)290.29%
||
|
|-
|Edmonton-Calder
|
|Lynn Faulder3,86032.32%|||
|Lance D. White4,80240.21%
|
|Alex McEachern3,25027.21%
|
|
|
||||
|
|-
|Edmonton-Castle Downs
|
|Ihor Broda4,37340.43%|||
|Pamela Paul4,45641.20%
|
|Peter Johnsen1,49413.81%
|
|David H. Friesen4604.25%
|
||||
|
|-
|Edmonton-Centre
|
|Don Weiderman3,63433.36%|||
|Laurie Blakeman4,76943.78%
|
|Jenn Smith1,84516.94%
|
|Alan Cruikshank4203.86%
|
|Emil van der Poorten (Forum)980.90%Richard Johnsen (Nat. Law)830.76%
||
|Michael Henry
|-
|Edmonton-Ellerslie
|
|Jasbeer Singh2,64125.96%|||
|Debby Carlson5,75256.54%
|
|Henry Johns9138.97%
|
|Ken Way8408.26%
|
||||
|Debby Carlson
|-
|Edmonton-Glengarry
|
|Don Clarke3,47434.38%|||
|Bill Bonner4,76547.15%
|
|William Kobluk1,36613.52%
|
|Barbie-Jo Williams3353.32%
|
|David Sharkey (Nat. Law)760.75%Carl Williams (Ind.)460.46%
||
|Laurence Decore
|-
|Edmonton-Glenora
|
|Kim MacKenzie4,36836.18%|||
|Howard Sapers5,78547.92%
|
|Arlene Young1,1989.92%
|
|Jon Dykstra6305.22%
|
|Sam Thomas (Nat. Law)690.57%|||
|Howard Sapers
|-
|Edmonton-Gold Bar
|
|Susan Green5,81937.52%|||
|Hugh MacDonald7,52848.55%
|
|Walter Heneghan1,97012.70%
|
|
|
|David J. Parker (Green)920.59%Maury Shapka (Nat. Law)750.48%
||
|Bettie Hewes
|-
|Edmonton-Highlands
|
|Jim Campbell2,79324.96%
|
|Chris Smith2,28420.41%|||
|Pam Barrett5,63850.38%
|
|Tim Friesen4193.74%
|
||||
|
|-
|Edmonton-Manning
|
|Tony Vandermeer4,35835.44%|||
|Ed Gibbons5,14041.80%
|
|Hana Razga2,22918.13%
|
|R. Jordan Harris5244.26%
|
||||
|Peter Sekulic
|-
|Edmonton-McClung
|
|Michael Mooney5,25940.71%|||
|Grant Mitchell6,32248.94%
|
|Richard Vanderberg7135.52%
|
|Patrick D. Ellis5424.20%
|
|Wade McKinley (Nat. Law)610.47%|||
|Grant Mitchell
|-
|Edmonton-Meadowlark
|
|Laurie Pushor4,67238.72%|||
|Karen Leibovici6,04750.11%
|
|Terry McNally8316.89%
|
|Aaron Hinman4353.60%
|
|Geoff Toane (Nat. Law)550.46%|||
|Karen Leibovici
|-
|Edmonton-Mill Creek
|
|Sukhi Randhawa3,67928.23%|||
|Gene Zwozdesky6,75751.84%
|
|Stephen Crocker1,80413.84%
|
|Christie Forget7765.95%
|
||||
|
|-
|Edmonton-Mill Woods
|
|Ziad N. Jaber2,99329.97%|||
|Don Massey5,11351.19%
|
|Ricardo Acuna1,26612.68%
|
|John Filp5465.47%
|
|Raymond Boyko (Green)520.52%|||
|Don Massey
|-
|Edmonton-Norwood
|
|Andrew Beniuk2,58327.98%|||
|Sue Olsen3,35736.36%
|
|Sherry McKibben2,76729.97%
|
|Ray Loyer4855.25%
|
||||
|Andrew Beniuk
|-
|Edmonton-Riverview
|
|Gwen Harris5,12235.43%|||
|Linda Sloan6,06641.96%
|
|Donna Fong2,26115.64%
|
|David Prenoslo8055.57%
|
|William Chapman (Nat. Law)870.60%Naomi Rankin (Comm.)610.42%
||
|
|-
|Edmonton-Rutherford
|
|Brenda Platzer5,07838.91%|||
|Percy Wickman6,00746.03%
|
|Will Hodgson1,1568.86%
|
|David Lincoln6745.16%
|
|Ian Zaharko (Ind.)190.15%
||
|Percy Wickman
|-
|Edmonton-Strathcona
|
|John Logan4,09630.44%
|
|Mary MacDonald4,21431.31%|||
|Raj Pannu4,27231.74%
|
|John Forget5524.10%
|
|Eshwar Jagdeo (Nat. Law)470.35%Myles Kitagawa (Green)2361.75%|||
|Al Zariwny
|-
|Edmonton-Whitemud|||
|David Hancock7,97350.79%
|
|Corky Meyer5,95337.92%
|
|Charan Khehra1,0126.45%
|
|Kevin Bialobzyski6354.04%
|
|Randy T. Fritz (Nat. Law)590.38%|||
|Mike Percy
|-
|Fort McMurray|||
|Guy C. Boutilier5,42055.64%
|
|John S. Vyboh4,00841.14%
|
|Rodney McCallum2802.87%
|
|
|
||||
|Adam Germain
|-
|Grande Prairie-Smoky|||
|Walter Paszkowski5,75364.49%
|
|John A. Croken1,99522.36%
|
|Linda Smith1,14312.81%
|
|
|
||||
|Walter Paszkowski
|-
|Grande Prairie-Wapiti|||
|Wayne Jacques5,59263.08%
|
|Ray Stitsen2,00322.59%
|
|Campbell Ross1,24714.07%
|
|
|
||||
|Wayne Jacques
|-
|Highwood|||
|Don Tannas9,55169.76%
|
|Howard Paulsen1,94414.20%
|
|Hugh Logie5924.32%
|
|John Bergen1,56611.44%
|
||||
|Don Tannas
|-
|Innisfail-Sylvan Lake|||
|Gary Severtson7,01259.53%
|
|Raymond C. Reckseidler2,20618.73%
|
|Linda Neilson5834.95%
|
|Carl Thorsteinson1,96016.64%
|
||||
|Gary Severtson
|-
|Lac La Biche-St. Paul|||
|Paul Langevin4,79953.71%
|
|Vital Ouellette2,90132.47%
|
|Grace Johnston4194.69%
|
|Peter Tychkowsky4835.41%
|
|Don Ronaghan (Forum)1912.14%Louis Real Theriault (Ind.)1141.28%
||
|Paul Langevin
|-
|Lacombe-Stettler|||
|Judy Gordon6,41461.62%
|
|Garfield Marks1,18111.35%
|
|Lynne Gendron1,06810.26%
|
|Bob Argent1,72516.57%
|
||||
|Judy Gordon
|-
|Leduc|||
|Albert Klapstein6,85751.42%
|
|Terry Kirkland4,79735.97%
|
|Bill Schlacht7675.75%
|
|Henry Neumann8916.68%
|
||||
|Terry Kirkland
|-
|Lesser Slave Lake|||
|Pearl M. Calahasen3,38960.33%
|
|Ralph Chalifoux1,13920.28%
|
|Glenn Laboucan4427.87%
|
|Robert J. Alford62411.11%
|
||||
|Pearl M. Calahasen
|-
|Lethbridge-East
|
|Leah Waters3,81329.46%|||
|Ken Nicol7,57858.54%
|
|Inga Jesswein6745.21%
|
|Jonathan Williams8536.59%
|
||||
|Ken Nicol
|-
|Lethbridge-West|||
|Clint Dunford5,67945.23%
|
|Leslie Vaala4,76537.95%
|
|Tom Hovan8066.42%
|
|Brian Stewart1,0438.31%
|
|Don Ferguson (Green)2401.91%|||
|Clint Dunford
|-
|Little Bow|||
|Barry McFarland6,72669.17%
|
|Alida Hess2,07521.34%
|
|Marko Hilgersom8688.93%
|
|
|
||||
|Barry McFarland
|-
|Livingstone-Macleod|||
|David Coutts5,33750.84%
|
|Ernie Patterson3,92437.38%
|
|Gwen De Maere5084.84%
|
|Bob Bysouth7036.70%
|
||||
|
|-
|Medicine Hat|||
|Rob Renner5,85351.48%
|
|Trevor Butts3,23228.43%
|
|George Peterson1,0659.37%
|
|Dale Glasier1,17710.35%
|
||||
|Rob Renner
|-
|Olds-Didsbury-Three Hills|||
|Richard Marz6,95856.95%
|
|Dave Herbert1,56212.78%
|
|Anne Wilson2472.02%
|
|Don MacDonald3,42228.01%
|
||||
|
|-
|Peace River|||
|Gary Friedel3,74561.25%
|
|Bruce MacKeen2,32337.99%
|
|
|
|
|
||||
|Gary Friedel
|-
|Ponoka-Rimbey|||
|Halvar C. Jonson5,75063.80%
|
|Joshua Phillpotts91210.12%
|
|Liz Wetheral8799.75%
|
|Randy Jones1,43915.97%
|
||||
|Halvar C. Jonson
|-
|Red Deer-North|||
|Stockwell Day4,68355.37%
|
|Norm McDougall2,54730.11%
|
|Linda Kaiser5606.62%
|
|E. Patricia Argent6557.74%
|
||||
|Stockwell Day
|-
|Red Deer-South|||
|Victor Doerksen5,75146.91%
|
|Larry Pimm4,96640.51%
|
|Joanne Stanley3672.99%
|
|Randy Thorsteinson1,1459.34%
|
||||
|Victor Doerksen
|-
|Redwater|||
|Dave Broda5,29743.76%
|
|Mary Anne Balsillie4,98041.14%
|
|Tom Turner7376.09%
|
|Don Bell9878.15%
|
|E. Benjamin Toane (Nat. Law)710.59%|||
|Nicholas Taylor
|-
|Rocky Mountain House|||
|Ty Lund5,61054.69%
|
|Roxanne V. Prior8808.58%
|
|Christine McMeckan4814.69%
|
|Lavern J. Ahlstrom3,26431.82%
|
||||
|Ty Lund
|-
|Sherwood Park|||
|Iris Evans8,61047.80%
|
|Bruce Collingwood8,30546.11%
|
|Vaughn Dyrland1,0645.91%
|
|
|
||||
|Bruce Collingwood
|-
|Spruce Grove-Sturgeon-St. Albert
|
|Gary Swinamer5,38842.52%|||
|Colleen Soetaert6,27549.51%
|
|Thomas Elchuk4763.76%
|
|Clinton Day4913.87%
|
||||
|Colleen Soetaert
|-
|St. Albert|||
|Mary O'Neill6,69643.53%
|
|Len Bracko6,68043.43%
|
|Chris Samuel1,1987.79%
|
|John Reil7815.08%
|
||||
|Len Bracko
|-
|Stony Plain|||
|Stan Woloshyn6,26748.85%
|
|Peter Marchiel3,90630.44%
|
|Felice Young8956.98%
|
|Pat Hansard1,74213.58%
|
||||
|Stan Woloshyn
|-
|Strathmore-Brooks|||
|Lyle Oberg7,23572.40%
|
|Roger Nelson1,27212.73%
|
|Richard Knutson6006.00%
|
|Dan Borden8628.63%
|
||||
|
|-
|Vegreville-Viking|||
|Ed Stelmach6,09049.71%
|
|Ross Demkiw3,63929.70%
|
|Greg Kurulok1,68413.74%
|
|Clifford Gundermann8106.61%
|
||||
|Ed Stelmach
|-
|Vermilion-Lloydminster|||
|Steve West5,61655.33%
|
|Pat Gulak2,78727.46%
|
|Wes Neumeier6025.93%
|
|Jeff Newland1,12511.08%
|
||||
|Steve West
|-
|Wainwright|||
|Robert A. (Butch) Fischer6,23252.61%
|
|Ronald Williams1,56813.24%
|
|Lilas I. Lysne6685.64%
|
|Jerry D. Barber3,34828.27%
|
||||
|Robert A. (Butch) Fischer
|-
|West Yellowhead|||
|Ivan J. Strang4,49841.96%
|
|Duco Van Binsbergen3,79535.40%
|
|Glenn Taylor2,13019.87%
|
|John Ahlstrom2752.57%
|
||||
|Duco Van Binsbergen
|-
|Wetaskiwin-Camrose|||
|LeRoy Johnson7,24458.39%
|
|Jody Saddleback1,1669.40%
|
|Rick Jantz2,06016.60%
|
|Karen Richert1,62213.07%
|
|Bruce Hinkley (Forum)2792.26%
||
|Ken Rostad
|-
|Whitecourt-Ste. Anne|||
|Peter Trynchy5,75954.12%
|
|Sara Lynn Burrough2,95427.76%
|
|Chauncey Featherstone7046.62%
|
|Earle Cunningham1,18311.12%
|
||||
|Peter Trynchy
|-
|}

See also
List of Alberta political parties

References

Further reading

External links
Original Elections Alberta Website for 1997 election
Present Elections Alberta Website for 1997 election

1997 elections in Canada
1997
March 1997 events in Canada